Drake Carr (born 1993, Flint, Michigan) is an American artist primarily known for his paintings and drawings of art and fashion luminaries and large-scale, cut-out works. Carr has exhibited his artwork across the United States at numerous exhibitions including Ethan James Green's New York Life Gallery, FIERMAN gallery, Situations gallery, and Anat Ebgi gallery in Los Angeles. Carr and Sabrina Bockler co-illustrated Samuel R. Delany’s book, Big Joe (Inpatient Press, 2021).

Work 
Carr was born in Flint, Michigan, in 1993. Upon moving to New York, he began painting large-scale cut-outs of friends and peers in a day-glow-like, hyper stylized manner. Carr has worked mostly in the service industry which he takes as a source of artistic inspiration. His works move across various medium in drawing, painting, cut-outs, sculpture, and installation.

References 

1993 births
American gay artists
American illustrators
Living people